Arababad (also Romanized as ‘Arabābād) is a village in Mahan Rural District, Mahan District, Kerman County, Kerman Province, Iran. At the 2006 census, its population was 185, in 54 families.

References 

Populated places in Kerman County